This is a list of notable events in music that took place in the 1470s.

Events
1470 
5 August – Guillaume Du Fay purchases some land in his homeland of Beersel to provide an income to establish his obiit.
November – Antoine Busnois is paid for "services … of which the duke [of Burgundy] wished no further mention to be made in the accounts"—probably a delicate diplomatic mission recruiting new musicians from another court.
Blind organist, harpist, lutenist, and fiddle player Conrad Paumann tours Italy, where his playing on various instruments causes a sensation at the court of the Gonzagas in Mantua.
1471
After fifteen years in the humble position of clerc in the Burgundian court chapel, Robert Morton is promoted to chappelain, a position in which he would remain until early 1476.
1475 – Organ builder Lorenzo da Prato completes his masterpiece, the organ in cornu Epistolae of the San Petronio Basilica in Bologna.

Bands formed
1479 – The Gosudarevï Pevchiye d′Yaki (literally Ruler’s Singing Clerks, the court choir of Moscow), is established by Ivan the Great.

Publications
1470 – Approximate date of the completion of the Buxheim Organ Book
1471 – Professional scribe Clara Hätzlerin completes her Liederbuch in Augsburg.
ca. 1473 – The Königsteiner Liederbuch is completed.
1475 – Johannes Tinctoris, Terminorum musicae diffinitorium, compiled by this year.
1476 – Johannes Tinctoris, Liber de natura et proprietate tonorum, completed 6 November.
1477 – Johannes Tinctoris, Liber de arte contrapuncti, completed 11 October.

Compositions
1470 – Guillaume Du Fay, Requiem Mass, for three voices (lost)
ca.1470–73 – Guillaume Du Fay, Missa Ave Regina Celorum
1472 – Loyset Compère, Omnium bonorum plena, motet, possibly written for the dedication of Cambrai Cathedral on 2 July.
1473 – Johannes Martini, Perfunde coeli rore, motet in four voices, composed for the wedding of Duke Ercole I d'Este and Eleonora d'Aragona
ca. 1476 – Alexander Agricola, Gaudent in celis, motet

Births
1470
9 April – Giovanni Angelo Testagrossa, Italian lutenist, singer, and teacher (d. December 1530)
Approximately this year
Elzéar Genet, dit Carpentras, French composer (d. 1548)
Antoine de Févin, French composer (d. 1511 or 1512)
Mathurin Forestier, French composer
Francisco de Peñalosa, Spanish composer (d. 1528)
Michele Pesenti, Italian composer and lutenist (d. after 1524)
Bartolomeo Tromboncino, Italian composer of frottole (d. after 1535)

Deaths
1470
25 February – Richard de Bellengues, dit Cardot, French singer and composer (b. ca. 1380)
1473
24 January – Conrad Paumann, German organist, harpist, lutenist, fiddle player, and composer (b. ca.1410)
1474
27 November – Guillaume Du Fay, French composer (b. ca. 1397)
1479
After 13 March – Robert Morton (composer)

References

15th century in music
Music